Charles William Sandman Jr. (October 23, 1921 – August 26, 1985) was an American Republican Party politician who represented Cape May County in the New Jersey Senate from 1954 to 1966 and represented southern New Jersey in the United States House of Representatives from 1965 to 1975. He ran for the Republican nomination for Governor of New Jersey three times, losing to Wayne Dumont in 1965 and William T. Cahill in 1969, but finally receiving the nomination by defeating incumbent Governor Cahill in 1973. He lost the 1973 general  election to Brendan Byrne in a historical landslide.

Biography

Personal
Sandman was born in Philadelphia, Pennsylvania. He graduated from Cape May High School, attained a bachelor's degree from Temple University in Philadelphia, and a law degree from Rutgers School of Law–Newark.

Sandman married Marion L. Cooney of Philadelphia and they had six children. Their sons, Robert S. Sandman, Charles W. Sandman III and Richard E. Sandman, followed their father's legal footsteps, establishing a law practice in Cape May Court House, New Jersey.

Sandman had a stroke on August 18, 1985, and died at a hospital in Cape May Court House on August 26, aged 63. At the time of his death, he was a resident of the Erma section of  Lower Township, New Jersey, and was interred in Cold Spring Presbyterian Cemetery in Cold Spring, New Jersey.

Career
Sandman served in the United States Army Air Corps as a navigator during World War II, and spent seven months as a prisoner of war in Germany after being shot down.

Before serving in Congress, Sandman was elected to three 4-year terms in the New Jersey Senate, in 1955, 1959, and 1963. He held the post of Majority Leader of that body in 1964 and 1965. In 1966, he ran for Congress while still holding his State Senate seat, which he resigned upon winning the federal office. He was a delegate to the Republican National Conventions in 1956, 1960, 1964 and 1968.

In 1973, Sandman ran for governor as a conservative, defeating moderate incumbent Republican William T. Cahill in the Republican primary election in a victory that "shocked party leaders", according to The New York Times. In the general election, Sandman lost to Democrat Brendan Byrne in a landslide, following the pattern where New Jersey would often elect moderate Republicans to statewide office but consistently reject more conservative Republicans.

Sandman was on the House Judiciary Committee when it considered articles of impeachment against President Richard Nixon. He was the most vitriolic defender of Nixon in the hearings. Notably, he insisted on hearing the specifics of each alleged impeachable offense. After the release of the "smoking gun" transcript, however, Sandman announced he would vote to impeach Nixon when the articles came up before the full House (as did every Republican who opposed impeachment in committee), calling their contents "devastating–impeachable."

In the 1974 Congressional elections, Republicans suffered generally because of the Watergate scandal that had by the time of the election forced Nixon to resign. Despite Sandman's change of heart on impeachment, his reputation was severely tarnished by his performance in the televised hearings. He was soundly defeated by Democrat William J. Hughes, his opponent in 1974, in an election that Sandman described as "not a Republican year" Following his defeat in his reelection bid for Congress, Sandman was approached by Vice President Nelson Rockefeller to join the Ford administration in various capacities including an ambassadorship of his choosing, Sandman declined and instead opted to accept Governor Thomas Kean's invitation to be appointed to the bench of the Superior Court of New Jersey.

Legacy
In 1986 all members of the Lower Township School District school board agreed to rename Lower Township Consolidated School to Charles W. Sandman Consolidated School.

In the 2019 Apple TV+ series, For All Mankind, actor Saul Rubinek played Sandman in a fictional storyline about NASA, Wernher von Braun and other space issues.

References

External links

Charles William Sandman Jr. at The Political Graveyard

1921 births
1985 deaths
20th-century American judges
20th-century American politicians
Burials at Cold Spring Presbyterian Church
Candidates in the 1973 United States elections
Military personnel from New Jersey
Military personnel from Philadelphia
New Jersey state court judges
Republican Party New Jersey state senators
People from Cape May, New Jersey
People from Lower Township, New Jersey
Politicians from Philadelphia
Presidents of the New Jersey Senate
Republican Party members of the United States House of Representatives from New Jersey
Rutgers School of Law–Newark alumni
Rutgers University alumni
Shot-down aviators
Temple University alumni
United States Army Air Forces pilots of World War II
World War II prisoners of war held by Germany